Brudzewice , (German: Brüsewitz) is a village in the administrative district of Gmina Suchań, within Stargard County, West Pomeranian Voivodeship, in north-western Poland.

References

Brudzewice